Ulrich "George" Klopfer (August 28, 1940 – September 3, 2019) was a German born American osteopathic physician and abortion provider from Indiana and Illinois.

Early life 
Klopfer was born on August 28, 1940, in Dresden, Germany. He told documentary filmmaker Mark Archer that he was staying with his aunt in the Dresden suburbs when the allies firebombed the city in 1945. Klopfer would have been four and a half years old at the time. This event, Archer noted, seemed to have been the defining moment of Klopfer's life.

Passenger records indicate that Klopfer came to the United States with his family aboard the Italia in 1952 at the age of 11. He used both his first name and the American spelling of his middle name, George, when attending Bloomfield High School in Bloomfield Hills, Michigan. He was a record-breaking runner on the track team and hoped to represent the United States in the Olympics. Upon graduating in 1959 he planned to become a chemical engineer. He was naturalized as a US citizen in Detroit, Michigan, on May 31, 1960.

Education and early medical career 
Klopfer attended the University of Michigan during the period 1960–1962. He graduated from Wayne State University in 1965 with a degree in organic chemistry. He graduated from the Chicago College of Osteopathic Medicine in 1971. He did his medical internship and residency at Chicago Osteopathic Hospital, completing his residency on July 31, 1976.

Klopfer became licensed to practice medicine in Illinois, Florida, and South Dakota before applying for his Indiana license in 1978. He served as a staff physician at Community Hospital in Evanston, Illinois, and as a clinical instructor at Chicago Osteopathic Hospital.

In 1978, Klopfer gained a Physician's Temporary Permit to work at Women's Pavilion, an abortion facility in South Bend, Indiana.  Klopfer originally worked at Women's Pavilion as a substitute for another physician. By November of that year he was also performing abortions at Chicago Loop Mediclinic.

Public attention 
Klopfer first gained notoriety in November 1978 when the Chicago Sun-Times published its "The Abortion Profiteers" series documenting illegal and otherwise troubling practices among Chicago-area abortion facilities. A nurse reported to an undercover investigator that Ming Kow Hah and Klopfer would race each other to see who could complete the most abortions in a single day. "When Hah is here, Klopfer really zips. Hah marks the patients on his leg, and if Klopfer sees that Hah’s got a leg full, he goes like wildfire to catch up." Another nurse said, "Klopfer would be having a cup of coffee and be on his last sip when he'd jump up and say, 'I'd better get going or Hah will have the whole recovery room full.'"

In September 2019, he gained attention when the sheriff's office of Will County, Illinois, said that authorities had found 2,246 preserved fetal remains at his home. An additional 165 remains were found in the trunk of a car in October, totaling 2,411 fetal remains. Klopfer had been a longtime doctor at an abortion clinic in South Bend, Indiana, and had also practiced in Gary, Indiana, and Fort Wayne, Indiana. In August 2016, the Indiana Medical Licensing Board suspended his medical license for failing to exercise reasonable care and violating several documentation requirements.

When family members of Klopfer began clearing out his belongings from his home after his death, they made the gruesome discovery, according to Chicago's ABC 7.

The family found the human remains and reported their find to authorities.

References

1940 births
2019 deaths
American abortion providers
American osteopathic physicians
Chicago College of Osteopathic Medicine alumni
Physicians from Indiana
People from South Bend, Indiana
German emigrants to the United States